was a Japanese television announcer, tarento, writer, singer and master of ceremonies. His nickname was "It's me". He was friends with Shingo Yamashiro. His son, Taro Itsumi is an actor, and his daughter, Ai Itsumi is an actress, tarento, and announcer.

Born in Osaka, Itsumi became a popular master of ceremonies. He was the only person who was able to govern three big talents; Takeshi Kitano, Sanma Akashiya and Tamori. However, he announced that he was suffering from stomach cancer on 6 September 1993. Japanese mass media reported on his condition. He died of linitis plastica on December 25, 1993, at the age of 48.

Books
 Itsumi, Masataka; Itsumi, Harue  (Kōsaidō Shuppan, 1994)

References

External links
 
 Itsumi Masataka

Japanese announcers
Japanese entertainers
Deaths from cancer in Japan
Deaths from stomach cancer
1945 births
1993 deaths
Masters of ceremonies
Musicians from Osaka
20th-century Japanese male singers
20th-century Japanese singers